Eat Sleep Die is a 2012 Swedish film written and directed by Gabriela Pichler. Set in present-day Sweden, it follows a realistic story about an unemployed young woman named Raša (Nermina Lukac), who struggles to find a new job while simultaneously taking care of her sick father (Milan Dragišić).

The film is Pichler's feature debut, and the cast consists primarily of amateurs. The film's main actress Nermina Lukac has received many accolades for her performance.

The film has received several awards. At the 48th Guldbagge Awards it received five nominations, including in the category Best Film, which it also won. Gabriela Pichler was awarded two awards for Best Director and Best Screenplay, and Nermina Lukac won the award for Best Actress. The film was also nominated for the 2013 Nordic Council Film Prize. The film was also selected as the Swedish entry for the Best Foreign Language Film at the 86th Academy Awards, but it was not nominated.

Plot
The film tells the story of 20-year-old Raša (Nermina Lukac), who lives with her sickly father (Milan Dragišić) in a small town in southern Sweden. Raša works in a local factory but is laid off when the factory downsizes. The film then follows her struggle to find a new job while simultaneously taking care of her father.

Cast

Nermina Lukač as Raša
Milan Dragišić as the father
Jonathan Lampinen as Nicki
Peter Fält as Peter
Ružica Pichler as Rosi
Nicolaj Schröder as Olle

See also
 List of submissions to the 86th Academy Awards for Best Foreign Language Film
 List of Swedish submissions for the Academy Award for Best Foreign Language Film

References

External links

2012 films
Films set in Sweden
Films set in the 2010s
Films shot in Sweden
Swedish drama films
Best Film Guldbagge Award winners
Films whose director won the Best Director Guldbagge Award
2010s Swedish-language films
2010s Swedish films